Robert Bergman may refer to:
 Robert Bergman (museum director) (1945–1999), art museum director and professor
 Robert G. Bergman (born 1942), American chemist
 Robert L. Bergman (1948–2013), American politician and businessman
 Bob Bergman, American football and track and field coach